Magdalena Antoinette Maria 'Marleen' Barth (born 21 March 1964) is a Dutch politician of the Labour Party (PvdA) and trade unionist, and a former journalist.

Early life and education 
Magdalena Antoinette Maria Barth was born on 21 March 1964 in Den Helder in the Netherlands.

Barth studied political science with a specialty in public administration at the University of Amsterdam.

Career 
Barth worked as a parliamentary reporter for Trouw (1990–1997), was a member of the House of Representatives (1998–2002), a member of the States-Provincial of North Holland (2003–2004), and chair of CNV Onderwijs (Christian teachers' union) (2005–2008). She was chair of GGZ Nederland (organisation for mental health) from 2008 to 2013.

She was lijsttrekker for the Labour Party in the Dutch Senate election of 2011 and 2015. From 7 June 2011, she was a member of the Senate as well as Senate group leader of the Labour Party. She stepped down as member of the Senate on 8 February 2018, after a controversy about her vacation during a Senate debate.

Personal life 
Marleen Barth is married to former D66 MP Jan Hoekema, (second marriage for both) who has been mayor of Wassenaar from 2007 to 2017.

References

External links 
 
 Marleen Barth (in Dutch) at the Senate website

1964 births
Dutch columnists
Dutch political journalists
Dutch trade union leaders
Dutch women in politics
Labour Party (Netherlands) politicians
Living people
Members of the House of Representatives (Netherlands)
Members of the Senate (Netherlands)
Members of the Provincial Council of North Holland
People from Den Helder
People from Wassenaar
University of Amsterdam alumni
Dutch women columnists